Mark Anthony Vientos (born December 11, 1999) is an American professional baseball third baseman for the New York Mets of Major League Baseball (MLB). He made his MLB debut in 2022.

Early life and amateur career
Vientos' father was born in the Dominican Republic and raised in New York where he became a fan of the New York Mets. As a result, Vientos grew up as a fan of the Mets.

Vientos spent his first three years of high school at Charles W. Flanagan High School in Pembroke Pines, Florida. In 2016, as a junior, he hit .321. That summer, he played in the Perfect Game All-American Classic at Petco Park. He transferred to American Heritage School in Plantation, Florida for his senior year in 2017. As a senior, he hit .417 over 26 games. After the season, he was selected by the New York Mets in the second round (59th overall) of the 2017 Major League Baseball draft. Vientos signed with the Mets for $1.5 million, forgoing his commitment to play college baseball at the University of Miami.

Professional career
After signing with the Mets, Vientos made his professional debut with the Rookie-level Gulf Coast League Mets before being promoted to the Kingsport Mets of the Rookie-level Appalachian League. Over 51 games between the two clubs, he batted .262 with four home runs and 26 RBIs. He returned to Kingsport in 2018, slashing .287/.389/.489 with 11 home runs and 52 RBIs in sixty games. In 2019, he played with the Columbia Fireflies of the Class A South Atlantic League, hitting .255/.300/.411 with 12 home runs, 62 RBIs, and 27 doubles over 111 games. After the season, he was named the Mets Minor League Hitter of the Year.

Vientos did not play a minor league game in 2020 due to the cancellation of the minor league season caused by the COVID-19 pandemic. To begin the 2021 season, he was assigned to the Binghamton Rumble Ponies of the Double-A Northeast. After slashing .281/.346/.580 with 22 home runs and 59 RBIs over 72 games, he was promoted to the Syracuse Mets of the Triple-A East in early September. Over 11 games with Syracuse, Vientos batted .278 with three home runs.

On November 19, 2021, the Mets selected Vientos' contract and added him to the 40-man roster. He returned to Syracuse to begin the 2022 season. In early June, he was placed on the injured list with knee discomfort, but returned just a little over a week later. He was selected to represent the Mets at the 2022 All-Star Futures Game alongside Francisco Álvarez. Over 101 games with Syracuse, he slashed .280/.358/.519 with 24 home runs and 72 RBIs.

On September 10, 2022, the Mets promoted Vientos to the major leagues. He made his MLB debut the next night at Marlins Park versus the Miami Marlins as the team's designated hitter, going hitless over five at-bats with two strikeouts as the Mets won 9-3.

On September 15, 2022, Vientos recorded his first major-league hit, a single off of Eric Stout of the Pittsburgh Pirates.

References

External links

1999 births
Living people
American sportspeople of Dominican Republic descent
Sportspeople from Pembroke Pines, Florida
Baseball players from Florida
American Heritage School (Florida) alumni
Major League Baseball third basemen
New York Mets players
Gulf Coast Mets players
Kingsport Mets players
Columbia Fireflies players
Binghamton Rumble Ponies players
Syracuse Mets players
American people of Nicaraguan descent